Ilhéu de Cima is an uninhabited island of Cape Verde. They are administratively a part of the Brava municipality. Surrounding islets include Ilhéu Luiz Carneiro, Ilhéu Sapado, and Ilhéu do Rei. The island is part of the integral nature reserve Ilhéus do Rombo, famous for its seabird colonies.

This is where the Ilhéu de Cima Lighthouse is situated, the only building on the island. The islet was mentioned as "Ghuay" in the 1747 map by Jacques-Nicolas Bellin.

Notable endemic fauna found on the island include the Iago sparrow. In the mid-1950s, W. R. P. Bourne observed females remaining in flocks while males began to take up locations on rocky slopes from which they could sing. A species of sponge Esperiopsis cimensis was found in the deep waters surrounding the islet.

See also
List of islands of Cape Verde

References

Uninhabited islands of Cape Verde
Protected areas of Cape Verde
Brava Municipality